Timothy P. Minear  (born October 29, 1963) is an American screenwriter and director. He has been nominated for four Emmy Awards  (2013, 2014, 2015, 2017) for his role as an executive producer on American Horror Story and Feud.

Life and career
Minear was born in New York City, grew up in Whittier, California, and studied film at California State University, Long Beach.

Minear was an assistant director on the film Platoon, and wrote episodes for several television series including The X-Files, Zorro, and Lois and Clark. He later wrote, executive-produced, and directed episodes of Strange World, Angel, Firefly, Wonderfalls, and The Inside (which he also created, with Howard Gordon).

Minear had another series, Drive, airing on Fox in April 2007, however it was cancelled by the network after only four episodes. Drive was set to return with two additional episodes on July 4, 2007, but these were rescheduled to July 13 and then cancelled. This continued his tradition of short-lived work on Fox.

Tim Minear has worked on several shows that have lasted for only one season including  Strange World,  Firefly, Wonderfalls,  The Inside,  Drive,  Dollhouse,  Terriers, and The Chicago Code. After nearly a decade of writing, and producing tv shows which lasted for a single season, the streak came to an end when he was hired to write, and produce for  Ryan Murphy's American Horror Story. Because of all of the shows he has written and produced that lasted for only one season, he took the Twitter handle "@CancelledAgain" to mark his status as a writer/producer who was consistently in search of more work. 

Minear often works with Joss Whedon, and his work is typically characterized by a sharp, black humour and an ability to portray characters who are sympathetic and understandable, but morally ambiguous.  Minear wrote the key episodes of Angel Season Two.

In 2004, Minear stated that he was hired to write a screenplay of The Moon Is a Harsh Mistress.

In 2007, he received a pilot commitment from ABC for Miracle Man, a drama series for which the company engaged in a bidding war with Fox Broadcasting Company. The series was being produced by 20th Century Fox Television, with which Minear had signed in an overall deal. Minear since 2011, when American Horror Story(AHS) debuted has been an executive producer for multiple successful shows for 20th Century Fox Television.These successful shows include AHS, as well as two shows Minear co-created, and  showruns,  9-1-1, its spin-off and 9-1-1: Lone Star. All of these shows were co-created with  Ryan Murphy, and Brad Falchuk.  In 2018, his ReamWorks company signed a new Fox deal. Minear signed this deal to make sure the shows he had co-created at Fox with  Ryan Murphy, and Brad Falchuk would remain in their creative control, as Murphy had just recently left Fox to produce shows for Netflix.

Credits

Lois and Clark: The New Adventures of Superman
4x05 "Brutal Youth" (writer)
4x11 "'Twas the Night Before Mxymas" (writer)
4x14 "Meet John Doe" (writer)
4x20 "I've Got You Under My Skin" (writer)
The X-Files
5x08 "Kitsunegari" (co-writer)
5x16 "Mind's Eye" (writer)
Strange World
1x02 "Lullaby" (writer)
1x04 "Spirit Falls" (co-writer)
Angel
1x05 "Sense & Sensitivity" (writer)
1x09 "Hero" (co-writer)
1x11 "Somnambulist" (writer)
1x15 "The Prodigal" (writer)
1x19 "Sanctuary" (co-writer)
2x02 "Are You Now or Have You Ever Been" (writer)
2x07 "Darla" (writer/director)
2x09 "The Trial" (co-writer)
2x10 "Reunion" (co-writer)
2x15 "Reprise" (writer)
2x16 "Epiphany" (writer)
2x21 "Through The Looking Glass" (writer/director)
3x03 "That Old Gang of Mine" (writer)
3x06 "Billy" (co-writer)
3x09 "Lullaby" (writer/director)
3x14 "Couplet" (co-writer/director)
3x20 "A New World" (director)
3x21 "Benediction" (writer/director)
4x22 "Home" (writer/director)
Firefly
1x02 "The Train Job" (co-writer)
1x03 "Bushwhacked" (writer/director)
1x08 "Out of Gas" (writer)
1x12 "The Message" (co-writer/director)
Wonderfalls
1x02 "Karma Chameleon" (writer)
1x07 "Barrel Bear" (unaired) (co-writer)
The Inside
1x01 "New Girl In Town" (teleplay & story/director)
1x06 "Thief of Hearts" (co-writer)
1x10 "Little Girl Lost" (unaired in US, UK Airdate 03/17/2006) (co-writer)
1x13 "Skin and Bone" (unaired) (story)
 Drive
1x00 "Unaired Pilot" (co-writer)
1x01 "The Starting Line" (co-writer)
1x02 "Partners" (co-writer)
 Dollhouse
1x05 "True Believer" (writer)
1x12 "Omega" (writer/director)
2x03 "Belle Chose" (writer)
2x11 "Getting Closer" (writer/director)
 Terriers
1x11 "Sins of the Past" (writer)
 The Chicago Code
1x04 "Cabrini-Green" (co-writer)
 American Horror Story
1x05 "Halloween (Part 2)" (writer)
1x11 "Birth" (writer)
2x01 "Welcome to Briarcliff" (writer)
2x07 "Dark Cousin" (writer)
2x13 "Madness Ends" (writer)
3x02 "Boy Parts" (writer)
3x09 "Head" (writer)
4x02 "Massacres and Matinees" (writer)
5x02 "Chutes and Ladders" (writer)
6x02 "Chapter 2" (writer)
6x09 "Chapter 9" (writer)
7x02 "Don't Be Afraid of the Dark" (writer)
7x11 "Great Again" (writer)
8x04 "Could It Be... Satan?" (writer)
9x02 "Mr. Jingles" (writer)
 Feud: Bette and Joan
1x02 "The Other Woman" (co-writer)
1x03 "Mommie Dearest" (writer)
1x04 "More, or Less" (co-writer)
1x06 "Hagsploitation" (co-writer, director)
 9-1-1 
1x01 "Pilot" (writer)
1x02 "Let Go" (writer)
1x10 "A Whole New You" (writer)
2x01 "Under Pressure" (writer)
5x01 "Panic" (writer)
 9-1-1: Lone Star
1x01 "Pilot" (writer)
3x01 "The Big Chill" (writer)
3x03 "Stock & Thaw" (writer)

See also

Mutant Enemy Productions

References

External links
TimMinear.net

Getting THE INSIDE Out... on DVD!
PopGurls Quickie with Tim Minear
The Drive News Blog
Tim Minear on The Glenn & Helen Show

1963 births
American male screenwriters
American television directors
Television producers from California
American television writers
California State University, Long Beach alumni
Living people
People from Whittier, California
Film directors from New York City
Film directors from California
American male television writers
Screenwriters from California
Screenwriters from New York (state)
Television producers from New York City